Space is one of the elements of design of architecture, as space is continuously studied for its usage. Architectural designs are created by carving space out of space, creating space out of space, and designing spaces by dividing this space using various tools, such as geometry, colours, and shapes.

References

External links

 Architecture and Aesthetics: The Center for the Study of Art and Architecture

Architecture
Design